Alexandra Park is an Australian actress. She is known for her role as Claudia Hammond in the Australian soap opera Home and Away in 2009. She also starred in the E! drama series The Royals as Princess Eleanor from 2015 to 2018.

Career
Park made her acting debut in the Australian television series The Elephant Princess in 2011, playing Veronica.

In 2009, she played Claudia Hammond in the soap opera Home and Away. During that time, she appeared in an episode of Packed to the Rafters in 2011. She appeared as Sienna in the 2012 short film Arc.

She also appeared in a 2013 episode of the television series Wonderland as Jodie. From 2015 to 2018, she portrayed Princess Eleanor in the E! original series The Royals.

Park played a filmmaker in the horror thriller film Carnifex, which screened at the Adelaide Film Festival in October 2022. It was South Australian film editor Sean Lahiff's directing debut. In the film, Park's character and two conservationists encounter a terrifying new species after huge bushfires have ravaged the land. Filmed in Kuitpo Forest, the film has large-scale special effects, and stars Sisi Stringer and Harry Greenwood, son of actor Hugo Weaving.

Filmography

References

External links
 
 

1989 births
21st-century Australian actresses
Actresses from Sydney
Australian film actresses
Australian soap opera actresses
Living people